is a command-line utility included in the textutils package of GNU Core Utilities for creating a standard output consisting of random permutations of the input.

The version of shuf bundled in GNU coreutils was written by Paul Eggert. It is not a part of POSIX.

Example
$ ls
Wikibooks  Wikipedia  Wiktionary
$ # Shuffles input 
$ ls | shuf 
Wikipedia
Wiktionary
Wikibooks
$ # Picks one random line from input
$ ls | shuf -n1
Wikipedia

See also

References

Unix text processing utilities